Mohammed Alaoui (born 1 January 1944) is a Moroccan basketball player. He competed in the men's tournament at the 1968 Summer Olympics.

References

External links
 

1944 births
Living people
Moroccan men's basketball players
Olympic basketball players of Morocco
Basketball players at the 1968 Summer Olympics
People from Fez, Morocco